Autumn Street is a 1980 novel by two-time Newbery Award-winning author Lois Lowry.

Synopsis
There were things to be afraid of in the woods at the end of Autumn Street. But the year she went to live in her grandfather's big house - when her father went off to fight in World War II- Elizabeth couldn't put a name to those dark, shadowy fears. She was grateful for the reassurance of Tatie's strong, enveloping brown arms which held her when she needed comforting, and she relished her friendship with Tatie's grandson, feisty and streetwise Charles, who called her dumb old Elizabeth but didn't mean it, and who taught her to take risks. Together the two lonely children tried to interpret for each other an adult world -which was always puzzling and often cruel. Together, finally, on a day when snow obscured everything but terror, they left that world behind them and entered the world that was waiting in the woods.

Characters
Elizabeth, protagonist, befriends Charles
Jessica, Elizabeth's sister
Charles, Tatie's grandson
Tatie, servant of Elizabeth's house
Grandmother, Elizabeth's stern grandma
Grandfather, Elizabeth's fun loving grandpa
Noah and Nathaniel, the twin brothers that live next door

See also

Lois Lowry's Bibliography

References

Bibliography
Lowry, Lois (1980). Autumn Street. Boston: Houghton Mifflin Company.

1980 American novels
American children's novels
Novels by Lois Lowry
Houghton Mifflin books
1980 children's books